Amhlaibh mac Domhnaill Fhinn Ua Dubhda (died 1135) was King of Ui Fiachrach Muaidhe.

Annalistic reference

 1135. Amhlaeibh, son of Domhnall Finn Ua Dubhda, lord of Ui-Amhalghadha, was slain by the Ui-Fiachrach of the north.

External links
 http://www.ucc.ie/celt/published/T100005B/

References

 The History of Mayo, Hubert T. Knox, p. 379, 1908.

People from County Sligo
Monarchs from County Mayo
12th-century Irish monarchs